The State and National Law School was an early practical training law school founded in 1849 by John W. Fowler in Ballston Spa, New York (Saratoga County). It was also known as New York State and National Law School, Ballston Law School, and Fowler's State and National Law School. In 1853 the school relocated to Poughkeepsie, New York (Dutchess County). The school closed in the 1860s.

History

Founded in 1849 by John W. Fowler, the school was one of the first in the country to provide practical training for law students, rather than just academic lectures on legal theories. The school began in the former Sans Souci Hotel in Ballston Spa, but only stayed in the facility for three years.

The school was under supervision of a Board of Trustees appointed by the New York State Legislature.

The National Law School used very advanced teaching methods for its time. "There, students were assembled into mock courtroom scenarios, playing all of the roles witnesses, bailiffs, jurors, and attorneys. The professors were the judges, and the teams of attorneys were given a set of facts to work with to build their case."

In 1849 the law school briefly hosted the Beta Proteron Charge of Theta Delta Chi fraternity.

The institution struggled financially and also encountered problems with its facilities in Ballston Spa. President Fowler made the decision to relocate the law school to Poughkeepsie in late 1852.

In January 1853 the school opened for its first term in Poughkeepsie.  The reasons given for the move as stated by the trustees: "The building in Ballston is old and the rooms are cold, while in Poughkeepsie our accommodations are comfortable and pleasant. The village to which we have removed is much larger and more pleasant than Ballston, containing six or eight flourishing Literary Institutions, of which four are Female Seminaries. The people of Poughkeepsie furnish, besides these Libraries, adequate funds to place the institution on a high and permanent basis."

Degrees granted

The board was authorized to confer upon each graduate the degree of LL.B. (Bachelor of Laws).

Closure
The law school closed in the early 1860s as the result of declining enrollment caused by potential students joining the military during the American Civil War.

Notable alumni
Despite its short tenure, the law school produced many prominent alumni:

 Chester A. Arthur, 1854, President of the United States 
 Sullivan Ballou, 1852, Union Army officer featured in Ken Burns's "The Civil War"
 Levi W. Barden, 1852, member of the Wisconsin State Assembly and the Wisconsin State Senate
 Washington Bushnell, 1853, Illinois Attorney General and member of the Illinois State Senate
 Angus Cameron, 1853, United States Senator from Wisconsin 
 Charles S. Cary, 1850, Solicitor of the United States Treasury and railroad and banking executive
 Julius Curtis, 1850, judge, and member of the Connecticut Senate
 Benjamin W. Dean, 1849, Secretary of State of Vermont
 Ralph Hill, 1851, United States Representative from Indiana
 William W. Grout, 1857, United States Representative from Vermont.
 Tim N. Machin, 1849, Lieutenant Governor of California
 Samuel D. McEnery, 1859, United States Senator/Governor of Louisiana 
 John F. Miller, 1852, United States Senator from California
 Henry Wilbur Palmer, 1860, United States Representative from Pennsylvania 
 James Innes Randolph, Lawyer, poet, topographical engineer, and Confederate Army major. Most famous poem was I'm A Good Ol' Rebel
 Niles Searls, 1849, Chief Justice of California Supreme Court
 Lionel Allen Sheldon, 1853, United States Representative from Louisiana 
 Julius L. Strong, 1853, United States Representative from Connecticut 
 Ormsby B. Thomas, 1856, United States Representative from Wisconsin 
 Henry D. Washburn, 1853, United States Representative from Indiana 
 William Brewster Williams, 1851, United States Representative from Michigan

See also
 Law of New York

References

1860s disestablishments in New York (state)
Defunct private universities and colleges in New York (state)
Educational institutions established in 1849
Law schools in New York (state)
Education in Saratoga County, New York
Poughkeepsie, New York
1849 establishments in New York (state)
Defunct law schools